The Supremes Produced and Arranged by Jimmy Webb is the twenty-sixth studio album released by the Supremes on the Motown label in 1972. It was the only Supremes LP produced (and chiefly written) by a non-Motown artist, successful songwriter and producer Jimmy Webb, and was the last album to feature early-1970s Supremes lead singer Jean Terrell. Only one single from the album was released in the United States, the ballad "I Guess I'll Miss the Man" from the musical Pippin. Other non-Webb tracks included Joni Mitchell's "All I Want", Harry Nilsson's "Paradise" and covers of hits by Bobby Lewis and Mina, respectively "Tossin' and Turnin'" and "La voce del silenzio".

Overview
Besides being Jean Terrell's final Supremes album, The Supremes Produced and Arranged by Jimmy Webb was the first of only two Supremes' LPs to include vocals from member Lynda Laurence, the other being the live album In Japan! Laurence had replaced Cindy Birdsong earlier in 1972 and joined original Supreme Mary Wilson and Terrell for these sessions just prior to her official inclusion into the group.

The Supremes Produced and Arranged by Jimmy Webb marked a departure from the Motown Sound that the Supremes had relied upon over the past decade, and moved the group out of its pop/R&B genre and into a rock/pop style masterminded by Webb. The result was an album that had a different sound to that which the public, and the Supremes themselves, were accustomed. On many of the tracks, Webb overdubbed additional background vocals by The Blossoms, in addition to the voices of Wilson and Laurence. Terrell sings lead on all of the tracks on the LP, except "I Keep It Hid", which features Wilson on lead vocals. Terrell duetted with Webb on "Once in the Morning".

The only US single from the album, the opening track "I Guess I'll Miss the Man", was not actually part of the Jimmy Webb project. Instead, it was a Stephen Schwartz song from the Motown-financed Broadway production of Pippin, handled by songwriters-producers Deke Richards and Sherlie Matthews. Although neither song nor album generated radio play or sales in the United States, two singles were released abroad,  both in 1973: "Cheap Lovin'" in Italy and "Tossin' and Turnin'" in the United Kingdom. Besides being Jean Terrell's favorite album as a Supreme, The Supremes Produced and Arranged by Jimmy Webb became a cult favorite.

With In Japan! distributed only in Europe and Japan, Supremes admirers elsewhere had to wait three years for a new album. After the Jimmy Webb project, the group released the single "Bad Weather", a funky song written and produced by Stevie Wonder, who had also recorded "Soft Days" with the trio for a future album. "Bad Weather" was a hit in disco floors and received extensive radio play in Europe, but had little promotion in the US. Disheartened, Jean Terrell left the group, Lynda Laurence followed when she became pregnant, and Mary Wilson had to assemble a new line-up.

Critical reception

Cashbox published, "Jimmy Webb produced and arranged this most satisfying Supremes creation since the group's re-organization. The unquestionable highlight of the session is a foamin' funky remake of Bobby Lewis' "Tossin' And Turnin'." Also on the upswing, Joni Mitchell's "All I Want" (complete with "Up Up And Away" riffs) and a strange lyrical bit of "Cheap Lovin'." On the sweet side, their latest single "Guess I'll Miss The Man" from "Pippin" and a beautiful "Silent Voices." They've got the feelin' and the talent to put it across."

Track listing
All songs produced by Jimmy Webb, except "I Guess I'll Miss the Man" (Sherlie Matthews and Deke Richards).

All lead vocals by Jean Terrell except where noted

Side one
"I Guess I'll Miss the Man" (Stephen Schwartz)
"5:30 Plane" (Jimmy Webb)
"Tossin' and Turnin'" (Bobby Lewis, Malou Rene)
"When Can Brown Begin?" (Webb)
"Beyond Myself" (Webb)
"La voce del silenzio" (Silent Voices) (Elio Isola)

Side two
"All I Want" (Joni Mitchell)
"Once in the Morning" (Webb) (lead singers: Jean Terrell, Jimmy Webb)
"I Keep It Hid" (Webb) (lead singer: Mary Wilson)
"Paradise" (Harry Nilsson)
"Cheap Lovin'" (Webb)

Personnel
Jean Terrell – lead and backing vocals
Mary Wilson – lead and backing vocals
Lynda Laurence – backing vocals
The Blossoms (Darlene Love, Fanita James, and Jean King) – additional backing vocals
Jimmy Webb – producer, arranger, composer, keyboards, vocals
Henry Lewry – engineer
Ray Rich – drums
Fred Tackett – guitar
Skip Mosher – bass guitar
Jim Britt – photography

Charts

References

1972 albums
The Supremes albums
Albums arranged by Jimmy Webb
Albums produced by Deke Richards
Albums produced by Jimmy Webb
Motown albums